Cremin is a surname. Notable people with the surname include:

 Con Cremin (1908-1987), Irish diplomat
 David Cremin (born 1930), Roman Catholic Bishop Emeritus of the Catholic Archdiocese of Sydney
 Deanna Cremin (1978–1995), American murder victim
 Eric Cremin (1914–1973), Australian golfer
 Francis Cremin (born 1910), Irish theologian
 Kieran Cremin (21st century), Irish Gaelic footballer
 Lawrence A. Cremin (1925–1990), American educational historian and administrator
 Mick Cremin (1923–2011), Australian rugby union player
 Patrick Cremin (21st century), British actor